The Phiomyidae are a family of prehistoric rodents from Africa and Eurasia. A 2011 study placed Gaudeamus in a new family, Gaudeamuridae.

Genera include:
 Acritophiomys
 Andrewsimys
 Elwynomys
 Gaudeamus
 Phiomys

References

Hystricognath rodents
Prehistoric rodent families
Eocene first appearances
Miocene extinctions